Idol stjörnuleit (season 4) was the fourth season of Idol stjörnuleit. Hrafna Hanna Elísa Herbertsdóttir won over Anna Hlín Sekulic.

Contestants
Hrafna Hanna Elísa Herbertsdóttir (winner, 15 May 2009)
Anna Hlín Sekulic (runner-up, 15 May 2009)
Guðrún Lísa Einarsdóttir (third, eliminated 8 May 2009)
Matthías Arnar Þorgrímsson (fourth, eliminated 1 May 2009)
Sylvía Rún Guðnýjardóttir (fifth, eliminated 24 April 2009)
Árni Þór Ármannsson (sixth, eliminated 17 April 2009)
Alexandra Elfa Björnsdóttir (seventh, eliminated 17 April 2009)
Gylfi Þór Sigurðsson (eighth, eliminated 3 April 2009)
Georg Alexander Valgeirsson (ninth, eliminated 27 March 2009)
Ólöf Katrín Þórarinsdóttir (tenth, eliminated 20 March 2009)
Stefán Þór Friðriksson (eleventh, eliminated 20 March 2009)
Sigurður Magnús Þorbergsson (twelfth, withdrew 20 March 2009)

Live show details

Heat 1 - Top 10 Girls (6 March 2009)

Heat 2 - Top 10 Boys (13 March 2009)

Live Show 1 (20 March 2009)
Theme:

Live Show 2 (27 March 2009)
Theme:

Live Show 3 (3 April 2009)
Theme: Film Hits

Live Show 4 (17 April 2009)
Theme: 70s Hits

Live Show 5 (24 April 2009)
Theme: Songs by Björgvin Halldórsson

Live Show 6 (1 May 2009)
Theme: My Birth Year

Live Show 7: Semi-final (8 May 2009)
Theme: Songs from the Eurovision Song Contest

Live final (15 May 2009)

References

Idol stjörnuleit
2009 Icelandic television seasons